The Lion of Punjab commonly refers to the Indian independence activist Lala Lajpat Rai (1865–1928).

The Lion of Punjab may also refer to:

 The Lion of Punjab (film), a 2011 Indian Punjabi film
 Ranjit Singh (1780–1839), the Maharaja of Punjab